Willy Gaebel (born 1879) was a German cinematographer active during the silent era. Employed on a number of films at the major studio UFA, he later worked as a still photographer.

Selected filmography
 Her Sport (1919)
 Rose Bernd (1919)
 Ruth's Two Husbands (1919)
 The Living Dead (1919)
 A Drive into the Blue (1919)
 The Three Dances of Mary Wilford (1920)
 Monika Vogelsang (1920)
 Hundemamachen (1920)
 Rebel Liesel (1920)
 The Golden Crown (1920)
 The Lady in Black (1920)
 The Pearl of the Orient (1921)
 The Bull of Olivera (1921)
 The Fateful Day (1921)
 Hannerl and Her Lovers (1921)
 A Blackmailer's Trick (1921)
 Today's Children (1922)
 It Illuminates, My Dear (1922)
 Lumpaci the Vagabond (1922)
 The Weather Station (1923)
 The Pilgrimage of Love (1923)
 The Secret of Brinkenhof (1923)
 Mother and Child (1924)
 Colibri (1924)
 Kaddish (1924)
 The Director General (1925)
 The Heart on the Rhine (1925)
 The Painter and His Model (1925)
 Niniche (1925)
 Vanina (1925)
 False Shame (1926)
 The Master of Death (1926)
 Professor Imhof (1926)
 Fedora (1926)

References

Bibliography
 Jung, Uli & Schatzberg, Walter. Beyond Caligari: The Films of Robert Wiene. Berghahn Books, 1999.

External links

1879 births
Year of death unknown
German cinematographers
People from Grudziądz